Idlewood station is an elevated busway station operated by Pittsburgh Regional Transit near the East Carnegie and Oakwood neighborhoods of Pittsburgh, Pennsylvania. The station is located on the West Busway and is served by routes 28X, G2, G3 and G31. The station is named for the nearby Idlewood Road.

The station has a 33-space park and ride lot.

References

Port Authority of Allegheny County stations
Bus stations in Pennsylvania
West Busway